Goparam Meghwal as an Indian politician from Samdari. He is a former Member of Legislative Assembly from Siwana constituency Rajasthan. leader of Indian National Congress.

References

Indian National Congress politicians
Living people
Rajasthan MLAs 1998–2003
Year of birth missing (living people)
People from Barmer district
Indian National Congress politicians from Rajasthan